Bacem Anas Romdhani (born 3 December 1995 in Tunis) is a Tunisian-British violinist. He lives in London. He plays on a contemporary violin made by Andreas Hellinge made specially for Lord Yehudi Menuhin.

Biography 
His early career started in 2005 at the age of nine, when he was invited as a soloist to play with the Tunisian Symphony Orchestra. This early exposure to the Tunisian public peaked the interest of multi-award-winning Tunisian film producer Hichem Ben Ammar, which later developed into a documentary depicting Bacem Anas musical journey over the next four years.

In 2006, Bacem Anas won the chance of a lifetime when he won the World Philharmonic Orchestra ‘Five Children of the World’ International competition in Paris. He was scouted to represent Tunisia, Africa & the Arab world. He flew to Paris to join the orchestra as concertmaster under the baton of world renowned Japanese conductor Yutaka Sado. The event was held at Les Invalides and was attended by various celebrities.

During this French tour, Bacem Anas also won the first prize at the Vatelot-Rampal International violin competition.

Bacem Anas success came to the attention of the president of the Tunisian republic Zine El Abidine Ben Ali, at which point he received a personal invite to the presidential castle to be honoured for his successful musical journey.

His multi-award-winning documentary Kène ya ma kène... (Once Upon Our Time) was released in 2010, which chronicles his journey from 2006 to 2010. It was screened at various film festivals and won first prize at the 20th Milan festival of African, Asian & Latin American cinema in March 2010 & 1st prize at the 30th Verona festival in November 2010.

Highlights of his career include being the first Arab classical artist to be in the semi-final of the Queen's Windsor Festival International String Competition WFISC 2021 in United Kingdom, winning third prize at the Vienna New Year's Concert International Music Competition 2021 and winning first prize at the Vatelot-Rampal International Violin Competition 2007 in Paris before turning twelve.

He made his debut performance at the Wigmore Hall in London in 2014.

Early life and education 
Bacem Anas was born in Tunis, Tunisia, to Meriem Ben Hamada, an owner of a kindergarten business and Abderraouf Romdhani, founder and artistic director of Conservatoire Zyriab for Music and Dance one of the top leading private music schools in the country. His father is one of the longest serving principal Trombones of the Tunisian symphony orchestra and for-mer music professor.

Long before Bacem Anas was born, his father Abderraouf had a vision to guide his son to become one of the best classical violinist and musician Tunisia has ever seen.

His mother made sure to put headphones regularly on her tummy, with different CD's being played featuring music by Chopin, Mozart, Beethoven, Tchaikovsky and Vivaldi.

Bacem Anas began playing the violin at the age of five, at his father's music school from 2000 to 2007. Simultaneously, he joined the swimming club ‘Ben Arous’ at the Olympic swimming pool of Radés and was placed in national tournaments where he won a few. Bacem Anas’ first teacher was Rachid Koubaa, former concert-master of the Tunisian symphony orchestra. His second teacher was Sem Slimane, also former concert-master of the Tunisian symphony Orchestra.

In 2007 aged eleven, he auditioned for one of the world's most prestigious music schools in the United Kingdom, the Yehudi Menuhin School, and went on to win a place under full scholarship for the duration of seven years. There he studied with Akiko Ono and Simon Fischer. He curried on his studies with prof. Fischer by joining the Guildhall School of Music and Drama and graduated with a Bachelor of Music (Hons) in 2018. He moved to the Royal College of Music to finish his Master in Performance with professor Maciej Rakowski and later concluding his studies with professor Radu Blidar with an Artist Diploma in 2022.

Instrument 
Bacem Anas plays on the 'ex.Menuhin' fine contemporary violin made by Andreas Hellinge in Geneva 1998.

In 1998, Lord Yehudi Menuhin consigned the fabled 1742 Lord Wilton Del Gesu for sale with Hug and Co in Zurich. Whilst it was for sale, the company invited the Swiss maker Andreas Hellinge to produce two ‘bench copies’ of the violin.  This is one of those copes that was intended for presentation to Menuhin as a memento of the sale. It is arguably amongst the most important contemporary violins commissioned for Menuhin. The violin has superb playing qualities, and is both musically and technically one of the best modern del Gesu copies.

Personal life 
In 2007 Bacem Anas moved to the United Kingdom aged eleven and is currently resident in London. He has three sisters, Ons Wafa Romdhani born in 2002, Azza Romdhani born in 2006 and Nahawend Romdhani born in 2009. The Romdhani family also have a Jack Russell dog named Mozart Romdhani.

Awards 

 Third prize at Vienna New Year's Concert International Music Competition (Vienna, 2021)
 Semi-Final at Windsor Festival International String Competition (UK, 2021)
 Amsha Trust Award, (Switzerland, 2021)
 Community Jameel Hardship Fund, (Saudi Arabia, 2021)
 Community Jameel Hardship Fund (Saudi Arabia, 2020)
 Full Scholarship Award, Royal College of Music (London, 2020)
 Full Scholarship Award, Royal Academy of Music (London, 2020)
 Parikian Award (London, 2018)
 Full Scholarship Award, Royal College of Music (London, 2018)
 Rambourg Foundation Award (Tunisia, 2015)
 Full Scholarship Award, Guildhall School of Music & Drama (London, 2014)
 Solo Concert Artist in Residence, Tunisian Symphony Orchestra (Tunisia, 2014)
 Scholarship Award, Mawel Association, (Tunisia, 2008)
 Full Scholarship Award, Habib Bourguiba Foundation (Tunisia, 2007)
 Full Scholarship Award, The Yehudi Menuhin School (London, 2007)
 Honours award from the president of Tunisian republic (Tunisia, 2007)
 First prize Vatelot-Rampal International violin competition (Paris, 2007)
 Jean-Luc Lagardère Foundation Scholarship (Paris, 2006)
 World Philharmonic Orchestra ‘Five Children of the World’ grant (Paris, 2006)

Recordings 

 J.S.Bach: Violin Partita No.3 in E Major, BWV 1006: III.Gavotte en Rondeau, 2021
 J.S.Bach: Violin Sonata No.1 in G Minor, BWV 1001: I.Adagio (Live), 2021

Documentary

Kène ya ma kène... (2010) 
In 2006, the ten years old violin prodigy Bacem Anas Romdhani, from the suburbs of Tunis won the World Philharmonic Orchestra competition, where he was chosen to represent Tunisia, Africa and Arab World in the classical music domain, as part of the ‘Five Children of the World’. He was awarded the ‘Jean-Luc Lagardère’ scholarship.

Filmography

Documentary 

 2010: Kène ya ma kène... (Once Upon Our Time) by Hichem Ben Ammar

References

External links 

 

1995 births
English violinists
Tunisian violinists
Living people
21st-century violinists
21st-century English male musicians
Male classical violinists